In mathematics, in the area of symplectic topology, relative contact homology is an invariant of spaces together with a chosen subspace. Namely, it is associated to a contact manifold and one of its Legendrian submanifolds. It is a part of a more general invariant known as symplectic field theory, and is defined using pseudoholomorphic curves.

Legendrian knots
The simplest case yields invariants of Legendrian knots inside contact three-manifolds.  The relative contact homology has been shown to be a strictly more powerful invariant than the "classical invariants", namely Thurston-Bennequin number and rotation number (within a class of smooth knots).

Yuri Chekanov developed a purely combinatorial version of relative contact homology for Legendrian knots, i.e. a combinatorially defined invariant that reproduces the results of relative contact homology.

Tamas Kalman developed a combinatorial invariant for loops of Legendrian knots, with which he detected differences between the fundamental groups of the space of smooth knots and of the space of Legendrian knots.

Higher-dimensional legendrian submanifolds
In the work of Lenhard Ng, relative SFT is used to obtain invariants of smooth knots: a knot or link inside a topological three-manifold gives rise to a Legendrian torus inside a contact five-manifold, consisisting of the unit conormal bundle to the knot inside the unit cotangent bundle of the ambient three-manifold.  The relative SFT of this pair is a differential graded algebra; Ng derives a powerful knot invariant from a combinatorial version of the zero-th degree part of the homology.  It has the form of a finitely presented tensor algebra over a certain ring of multivariable Laurent polynomials with integer coefficients.  This invariant assigns distinct invariants to (at least) knots of at most ten crossings, and dominates the Alexander polynomial and the A-polynomial (and thus distinguishes the unknot).

See also
 Relative homology

References
 Lenhard Ng, Conormal bundles, contact homology, and knot invariants.  
 Tobias Ekholm, John Etnyre, Michael G. Sullivan, Legendrian Submanifolds in $R^{2n+1}$ and Contact Homology.
 Yuri Chekanov, "Differential Algebra of Legendrian Links".  Inventiones Mathematicae 150 (2002), pp. 441-483.
 Contact homology and one parameter families of Legendrian knots by Tamas Kalman

Symplectic topology
Morse theory
Homology theory
Contact geometry